Manoel Alencar do Monte (born 6 September 1892, date of death unknown), known as Alencar, was a Brazilian footballer. He played in four matches for the Brazil national football team in 1916. He was also part of Brazil's squad for the 1916 South American Championship.

References

External links
 

1892 births
Year of death missing
Brazilian footballers
Brazil international footballers
Place of birth missing
Association footballers not categorized by position